The Basketball tournament of the 2006 Lusophone Games was played in Macau, People's Republic of China. The venue was the Tap Seac Multi-sports Pavilion. The tournament was played from 8  to 14 October 2006, and there was a men's and women's competition. The male and female teams of Portugal and Mozambique, respectively, were the winners of both tournaments, beating in the final, Angola and Portugal. The bronze medals went to both the Cape Verdian teams.

Basketball medal table by country

Male event

Round robin

Semi-final

Bronze Medal

Gold Medal

Female event

Round robin

Semi-final

Bronze Medal

Gold Medal

See also
ACOLOP
Lusophone Games
2006 Lusophone Games

Basketball at the Lusofonia Games
Basketball
2006 in basketball
2006–07 in Chinese basketball
International basketball competitions hosted by China